The 1999 Internazionali Femminili di Palermo doubles was the doubles event of the twelfth edition of the second most prestigious women's tennis tournament held in Italy. Pavlina Nola and Elena Wagner were the defending champions, but Nola did not compete this year. Wagner therefore competed with Laurence Courtois as the third seed, and was defeated in the semifinals by second seeds Tina Križan and Katarina Srebotnik.

Križan and Srebotnik then ended up winning the tournament by defeating home players Giulia Casoni and Maria Paola Zavagli in the final.

Seeds

Draw

Qualifying

Seeds

Qualifiers
  Joannette Kruger /  Li Fang

Lucky losers
  Nina Nittinger /  Magüi Serna

Qualifying draw

References
 ITF singles results page

Doubles
Torneo Internazionali Femminili di Palermo - Doubles